The tenth and final season of the CBS police procedural drama series Hawaii Five-0 premiered on September 27, 2019, for the 2019–20 television season. CBS renewed the series for a tenth season in May 2019. The season contained 22 episodes and concluded on April 3, 2020.

The series continues to center on the Five-0 Task Force, a specialized state police task force, established by the Hawaiian Governor that investigates major crimes in the state of Hawaii including murder, terrorism, and human trafficking. All ten main cast members returned from season 9, however Jorge Garcia only appeared in one episode this season. Katrina Law was added to the main cast as Quinn Liu. Former main cast members Masi Oka and Michelle Borth guest-starred as Dr. Max Bergman and Catherine Rollins, respectively.

Four characters from Magnum P.I. guest starred in episode 12, which was a two-part crossover that concluded on Magnum P.I. As with season 9, several characters continued to make guest appearances on Magnum P.I.

The most watched episode of the season, was the series finale, "Aloha", with 9.59 million viewers. The second-most-watched was the penultimate episode, "A ʻohe ia e loaʻa aku, he ulua kapapa no ka moana", with 8.44 million viewers.

Cast and characters

Main
 Alex O'Loughlin as Lieutenant Commander Steven "Steve" McGarrett, United States Navy Reserve
 Scott Caan as Detective Sergeant Daniel "Danny" "Danno" Williams
 Ian Anthony Dale as Officer Adam Noshimuri
 Meaghan Rath as Officer Tani Rey
 Jorge Garcia as Special Consultant Jerry Ortega
 Beulah Koale as Officer Junior Reigns
 Katrina Law as Army CID Sergeant Quinn Liu, later Five-0 Task Force
 Taylor Wily as Kamekona Tupuola
 Dennis Chun as Sergeant Duke Lukela, Honolulu Police Department
 Kimee Balmilero as Dr. Noelani Cunha, Medical Examiner
 Chi McBride as Captain Lou Grover

Recurring
 Shawn Mokuahi Garnett as Flippa
 Fernando Chien as Kenji Higashi

Guest stars

 Gabriel Ellis as Roger Maliah
 Eugenia Yuan as Daiyu Mei
 Sonny Saito as Hajime Masuda
 Rob Morrow as Wes Cullen
 Joey Lawrence as Aaron Wright
 Masi Oka as Dr. Max Bergman
 Christine Lahti as Doris McGarrett
 Presilah Nunez as Dr. Emma Okino
 Meta World Peace as himself 
 Cassandra Hepburn as Junior's mother
 Michelle Hurd as Renee Grover, Lou's wife
 Alon Aboutboul as Zev Shazam
 Colby Ryan McLaughlin as Luke
 Kate Siegel as Joanna Di Pietra
 Sumalee Montano as Yang
 Jack Cutmore-Scott as Gabe/Michael Blanton
 Lance Gross as Lincoln Cole, a decorated former Marine Gunnery Sergeant with the Fleet Anti-terrorism Security Team.
 Suzanne Cryer as Suzanne Ridge
 Jean Ota as Iolana Cunha
 Roy M. Balmilero as Joseph Cunha
 Enson Inoue as Etsuji
 Rodney Rowland as Oz
 Donavon Frankenreiter as himself
 Zach Sulzbach as Charlie Williams
 Brittany Ishibashi as Tamiko Masuda
 Nia Holloway as Bonnie Siobhan; Grover's niece
 Jimmy Buffett as Frank Bama
 Willie Garson as Gerard Hirsch
 Eva De Dominici as Maria
 James Marsters as Victor Hesse
 William Sadler as John McGarrett
 Mark Dacascos as Wo Fat
 Chuck Norris as Lee Phillips, a retired sergeant major who is helping his mentee; Lincoln Cole
 Michelle Borth as Catherine Rollins

Crossover characters
 Jay Hernandez as Thomas Magnum, a former Navy SEAL who is currently a security consultant
 Perdita Weeks as Juliet Higgins, a former MI6 agent who is currently a majordomo
 Zachary Knighton as Orville "Rick" Wright, a Marine veteran and former door gunner, who runs his own tiki bar
 Stephen Hill as Theodore "TC" Calvin, a Marine veteran and helicopter pilot who runs helicopter tours of Hawaii

Episodes

The number in the "No. overall" column refers to the episode's number within the overall series, whereas the number in the "No. in season" column refers to the episode's number within this particular season. The titles of each episode are in the Hawaiian language, though its English translations are directly underneath. "Prod. code" refers to the order in which the episodes were produced. "U.S. viewers (millions)" refers to the number of viewers in the U.S. in millions who watched the episode as it was aired.

Production

Development
On May 9, 2019, CBS renewed the series for a tenth season. CBS announced its fall schedule on May 15, 2019, and it was revealed that the series would undergo a time slot change, with the series being replaced by Magnum P.I. at its previous time slot, and the series now airing an hour earlier, holding the time slot formerly held by MacGyver which moved to mid-season. When interviewed about possible story lines for the tenth season, executive producer Peter M. Lenkov stated, "We're playing it real, with the real things that happen in people's lives as time marches on." CBS revealed its fall premiere dates on June 12, 2019 and announced that the season would premiere on September 27, 2019. Series star Alex O'Loughlin wrote the first filmed episode of the season. On February 14, 2020, it was announced that the season would conclude with a two-part season finale on April 3. It was later revealed this would be the series finale. The decision was based on several factors, most notably O’Loughlin's recovery from on-set injuries and contracts that were set to end this season. CBS had hoped to continue the Danno character in a sequel or continuation, but the producers decided not to go with the idea. As a result of the COVID-19 pandemic the NCAA announced that March Madness 2020 would be cancelled. Following this announcement, on March 13, 2020, CBS announced that with the timeslot being opened up the series finale would be split into two parts, the first part airing on March 27, with the second part airing on April 3, but keeping the series' regular timeslot.

Filming
Early filming for the season began on July 2, 2019 in Los Angeles, California. Filming officially began in Hawaii on July 18 with a traditional Hawaiian blessing. O'Loughlin also directed the first episode filmed. Primary filming for the series continued to take place in Honolulu, Hawaii, on the island of Oahu. The series had a sound stage at Hawaii Film Studio in Diamond Head where it filmed various indoor scenes. Exterior shots and outdoor scenes for McGarrett's house were filmed at the Bayer Estate in ʻĀina Haina.

Casting
On July 20, 2019, Christine Lahti announced that she would be returning as McGarrett's mom Doris McGarrett as a guest star in an episode. On August 14, 2019, it was announced that Katrina Law was joining the main cast as Quinn Liu, a former staff sergeant with Army CID recently demoted for insubordination.

On September 27, 2019, Jorge Garcia, who had played Jerry Ortega since the fourth season, left the series following the season premiere to focus on other projects; in the show, after recovering from being shot in the ninth season finale, Jerry leaves the task force to focus on writing a book. Garcia and producer Peter Lenkov both confirmed the former's exit, but assured that the door would be open for Jerry to later return as a guest star. Garcia is set to cross-over onto one of Lenkov's other series MacGyver during its fifth season portraying Jerry Ortega as a guest star. MacGyver previously crossed-over with Hawaii Five-0 in their first and seventh seasons, respectively.

On February 14, 2020, it was revealed that Lance Gross would have a major guest role for the two-part season finale with the possibility for Gross to become a series regular pending renewal of an eleventh season. However, on February 28, 2020, it was announced that the series would end after the tenth season. Chuck Norris made a cameo appearance in the season's penultimate episode as Lee Phillips, a retired sergeant major who is helping his mentee; Lincoln Cole. Former main cast member Michelle Borth returned in the final moments of the series finale as Catherine Rollins; however, her appearance was not mentioned in any press releases put out prior to the episodes airing. To avoid any spoiler she was also not included in the opening guest star credits. Instead, she appeared in the closing credits within her own caption.

Viewing figures

Home media

References

External links
 
 
 List of Hawaii Five-0 episodes at The Futon Critic
 

Hawaii Five-0 (2010 TV series) seasons
2019 American television seasons
2020 American television seasons